The 2012 Ukrainian Amateur Cup was the seventeenth annual season of Ukraine's football knockout competition for amateur football teams. The competition started on 15 August 2012 and concluded on 4 November 2012.

Competition schedule

First qualification round

Second qualification round

Quarterfinals (1/4)

Semifinals (1/2)

Final

See also
 2012 Ukrainian Football Amateur League
 2012–13 Ukrainian Cup

External links
 2012 Ukrainian Amateur Cup at the Footpass (Football Federation of Ukraine)

Ukrainian Amateur Cup
Ukrainian Amateur Cup
Amateur Cup